John Stokes BCanL (died 1503) was a Canon of Windsor from 1486 to 1503.

Career

He was appointed:
Warden of All Souls College, Oxford 1466 - 1494 
Rector of Broughton, Oxfordshire

He was appointed to the sixth stall in St George's Chapel, Windsor Castle in 1486 and held the canonry until 1503.

Notes 

1503 deaths
Canons of Windsor
Wardens of All Souls College, Oxford
Year of birth unknown